This page is a list of elections and their subsequent parliamentary makeups in New Zealand. After the adoption of the New Zealand Constitution Act 1852, which granted New Zealand self-governance, New Zealand has had a parliamentary system, with its first election in 1853. For a government to form, they must obtain the confidence of a majority of the elected MPs in Parliament. Initially, governments were formed through bargaining with individual MPs, however after the introduction of political parties in 1890, confidence was brokered through these parties when required.

Until the introduction of MMP in the 1996 election, electors voted only for their electorate MP; thereafter, party politics was formalised and third parties became viable, with electors now voting for both an electorate MP and a specific (and possibly unrelated) party. MMP changed the makeup of parliament such that outright majorities now became rare and parties had to regularly broker coalitions or confidence agreements to form governments.

Key

Table 
The following table lists all general elections held in New Zealand, displaying the dates of the elections, the officially recorded voter turnout, and the number of seats in Parliament each party won.
Note that elections for Māori seats initially took place separately from elections for general seats.

Statistics

Current parties

Defunct parties

Unrepresented vote 

source

References

Footnotes 

Elections in New Zealand
Government of New Zealand
Parliament
Parliament of New Zealand